The 1928 Tennessee Volunteers football team (variously "Tennessee", "UT" or the "Vols") represented the University of Tennessee in the 1928 Southern Conference football season. Playing as a member of the Southern Conference (SoCon), the team was led by head coach Robert Neyland, in his third year, and played their home games at Shields–Watkins Field in Knoxville, Tennessee.  The 1928 Vols won nine, lost zero and tied one game (9–0–1 overall, 6–0–1 in the SoCon). The only blemish on their schedule was a scoreless tie with Kentucky.  Tennessee outscored their opponents 249 to 51 and posted five shutouts.

On November 17, Tennessee beat in-state rival Vanderbilt for the first time since 1916.  Before 1928, Vanderbilt held a strong advantage over the Volunteers with a record of 18–2–3 in the first 23 meetings between the two school.  Since 1928, Tennessee has dominated the rivalry.

Schedule

Players

Line

Backfield

References

Tennessee
Tennessee Volunteers football seasons
College football undefeated seasons
Tennessee Volunteers football